Qakh District (Tsakhur: Къахын район) is one of the 66 districts of Azerbaijan. It is located in the north of the country and belongs to the Shaki-Zagatala Economic Region. The district borders the districts of Zagatala, Shaki, Samukh, Yevlakh, and the Russian Republic of Dagestan. Its capital and largest city is Qakh. As of 2020, the district had a population of 57,200.

Geography 
The region is dominated by hot and subtropical climate. However mountainous areas are rather cold. Annual rain precipitation varies from 300mm (in the south) to 1600mm in mountain areas.

Meadows, water resources, forests, and fertile soils are providing space for agricultural development, especially for walnut, chestnut production.

Heavy rains and snowmelts from mountains often result in a flood.

The region also has one of the biggest Natural Reserves in Azerbaijan named “Ilisu Natural Reserve”. Reserve is located near Aghchay village.

Region borders with Dagestan Republic (Russia) in north east, Zagatala region in the north, Samukh region in the south, Georgia in the west.
Gakh region accounts for 13% of water supplies of Caucasus (3873 cubic kilometers), 100 thousand cub meters of which are extracted for the administrative district, 63 000 of which used for irrigation and only 2 000 cub meters are used for agriculture. Rest is used for domestic consumption and production.

Local economy 
The local economy is specialized in crop production and livestock. The most common products produced here are tobacco and grain.

The main enterprises are canned food and vegetables. Other enterprises cover sweets, oil products, and beverages. Enterprises mainly cover domestic demand and ship products to other districts.

The region is also rich with minerals and building raw materials, such as rubble, sand, clay, sulfur, etc.

These materials are widespread in river valleys, especially in the valleys of the Kurmuk River and its branches.

Furthermore, mineral springs are also common in the region. Near Suskand village “Gah” mineral water is produced.

History
The Qakh region of Azerbaijan has a long history dating back to ancient times. Archaeological excavations the area had been populated during Eneolithic, Bronze and early Iron Ages. What remains of these early inhabitants' activities indicates they engaged largely in sedentary cultivation, animal-breeding and art. 
Qax (Kakhi) region was part of Kakheti-Hereti Kingdom and then part of the united Georgian kingdom. 
In 1921 Kakhi Region became part of Azerbaijan.

With the spread of Christianity throughout the region during the existence of Caucasian Albania, some Churches were built in the Qakh district. In the 8th century A.D., Qakh fell under Arab occupation. Starting from the 11th century first Oghuz Turks and later Qipchaq Turks inhabited the area, the region was incorporated into the Seljuq Empire. Qakh was later a part of Atabeg and Shirvanshah states. With the invasion of Hulaguids in Azerbaijan in the 13th century, Mongolian nomadic tribes populated the region. In 1562, by the order of the Safavid Shah Tahmasp I, Ilisu Sultanate was established in Qakh. In the 18th century, Ilisu Sultanate became so powerful that, the Ottoman Emperor conferred its ruler Ali Sultan Bey the highest title of Pasha recognizing him as the Beylerbey of Shaki.

In 1803 the sultanate of Ilisu was annexed to the Russian empire. The ruler of the sultanate, Daniyal, inspired the people to rise against Russian rule in 1844, due to a disagreement between him and the government of Russia. Sultan Daniyel was defeated near the village of İlisu and continued his struggle against Russian along with the leader of the national freedom movement, Sheykh Shamil. Russians burnt Ilisu and divided the territory of the sultanate into mahals (territorial units) and annexed them to the Jar-Balaken daire (a territorial unit) converting it into a colony of tsarist Russia. With proclamation of independence of Azerbaijan Democratic Republic in May 1918, Qakh became disputed between ADR and DRG. During the Soviet rule, Qakh was established as raion of Azerbaijan SSR in 1930.

Demographics 
The overall statistics indicate the population growth fluctuates. For instance, In 2000 there were 832 newly born, in 2006 - 816, down to 753 in 2009.

The Qakh District is also a centre of the Georgian minority in Azerbaijan, with most of the ones in this district being of Christian origin.

Villages 
There are 59 villages in the district:

 Ağçay
 Ağyazı
 Almalı
 Amanlı
 Armudlu
 Bağtala
 Baydarlı
 Böyük Alatəmir
 Cəlayer
 Çinarlı
 Çüdüllü
 Dəymədağlı
 Əlibəyli
 Əmbərçay
 Əmircan
 Fıstıqlı
 Güllük
 İbaxlı
 İlisu
 Keşqutan
 Kiçik Alatəmir
 Kötüklü
 Ləkit
 Ləkit Kötüklü
 Ləkit Malax
 Lələli
 Lələpaşa
 Malax
 Marsan
 Meşəbaş
 Oncallı
 Qapıçay
 Qarabaldır
 Qarameşə
 Qaratala
 Qaşqaçay
 Qaxbaş
 Qaxingiloy
 Qaxmuğal
 Qaysarlı
 Qazmalar
 Qımır
 Qındırğa
 Qıpçaq
 Qorağan
 Qum
 Sarıbaş
 Şıxlar
 Şotavar
 Süskən
 Tanqıt
 Tasmalı
 Turaclı
 Üzümlü
 Uzuntala
 Xələftala
 Yeni İlisu
 Zərnə
 Zəyəm

Gallery

References

 
Districts of Azerbaijan